Connor Bailey (born 10 October 2000) is a professional rugby league footballer who plays as a  or  forward for the Newcastle Thunder in the RFL Championship.

Career

2020
Bailey made his Super League debut in round 12 of the 2020 Super League season for Wakefield against Hull FC.

Newcastle Thunder (loan)
On 5 Dec 2020 it was reported that he had signed for the Newcastle Thunder on season-long loan.

Newcastle Thunder
On 10 Nov 2021 it was reported that he had signed for Newcastle Thunder in the RFL Championship

References

External links
Wakefield Trinity profile
SL profile

2000 births
Living people
English rugby league players
Newcastle Thunder players
Rugby league props
Wakefield Trinity players